Alpine skiing  has been featured as a sport in the Asian Winter Games since the first Winter Games in 1986.

Editions

Events

Medal table

List of medalists

References 

 
Sports at the Asian Winter Games
Asian Games alpine